The Cordillera Real is a mountain range in the South American Altiplano of Bolivia. This range of fold mountains, largely composed of granite, is located southeast of Lake Titicaca, and east of the Bolivian capital of La Paz, measuring 125 km in length and 20 km in width. Despite the fact that it is only 17° south of the Equator, the Cordillera Real is relatively densely glaciated. This is due to its proximity to the Amazon lowlands with its associated moist air masses.

Mountains 

Other notable peaks are:

See also 
 Cordillera Kimsa Cruz
 Ch'iyar Quta

References

Real